The ALCO RS-3 is a , B-B diesel-electric locomotive manufactured from May 1950 to August 1956 by American Locomotive Company (ALCO) and its subsidiary Montreal Locomotive Works (MLW). A total of 1,418 were produced: 1,265 for American railroads, 98 for Canadian railroads, 48 for Brazilian railroads, and seven for Mexican railroads.

The successor to the RS-1 and RS-2, the RS-3 was built with a single 12-cylinder ALCO Model 244 engine. The RS-3 greatly resembled the design and appearance of its predecessor, but had 100 more hp (1,600 hp) and some changes to the fuel system and body shape. Some had their engines replaced with more reliable EMD 567B engines, becoming RS-3ms.

Much like the RS-1, many RS-3s served for decades; some are still in use as of 2022.

Variants 
RSC-3: an RS-3 that used 3-axle trucks instead of 2-axle trucks. The middle axle on each truck was unpowered. This variant was designed for service on light track, as the extra axles better spread the weight of the locomotive.

Competition
ALCO built the RS-3 to compete with EMD, Fairbanks-Morse, and Baldwin Locomotive Works. In 1949, EMD introduced the EMD GP7. In 1950, Fairbanks-Morse introduced the  H-16-44. Also in 1950, Baldwin introduced the  Baldwin AS-16. All of this was to be more competitive with EMD. Fairbanks-Morse's  line was the H-15-44. Baldwin's  line was the Baldwin DRS-4-4-1500. But in 1954, EMD introduced the GP9.

In the end, EMD won the road switcher production race. EMD produced 2,729 GP7s. ALCO produced 377 RS-2s, and 1,418 RS-3s. Fairbanks-Morse produced 30 H-15-44s, and 296 H-16-44s. Baldwin produced 32 DRS-4-4-15s, and 127 AS-16s.

Exports

Brazil
In 1952 the Brazilian railway the Estrada de Ferro Central do Brasil purchased forty six new RS-3s from the Montreal Locomotive Works. Some are still active as work train engines for CPTM, Supervia, and CBTU – BH respectively São Paulo's, Rio de Janeiro's and Belo Horizonte's commuter railways. In Brazil these units were nicknamed Canadians or Hot Tails.

Spain
In 1964, the Spanish railway the Ferrocarril de Langreo purchased four RS-3s from the Terminal Railroad Association of St. Louis. A fifth unit, number 1604, was purchased in 1971 from the Burlington Northern Railroad (BN), a piece of surplus Great Northern Railway stock from the 1970 merger that formed BN.

See also
 List of ALCO diesel locomotives
 List of MLW diesel locomotives

References

RS-3
B-B locomotives
RS-3
Railway locomotives introduced in 1950
Passenger locomotives
Freight locomotives
Standard gauge locomotives of the United States
Diesel-electric locomotives of Brazil
Standard gauge locomotives of Spain
5 ft 3 in gauge locomotives
Standard gauge locomotives of Canada
Diesel-electric locomotives of Canada
Diesel-electric locomotives of Spain
Diesel-electric locomotives of the United States